Alejandro Guijarro (born 1979) is a Spanish contemporary artist who currently works between London and Madrid.

Early life

Guijarro was born in Madrid, where he began his artistic education at the Escuela de Arte N10, completing a BA (Hons) in Graphic Design in 2004. He then moved to London to attend the Royal College of Art, where he graduated from the MFA Photography programme in 2010.

Major works

His first major series, Momentum, received international critical acclaim, and can be found in the permanent collections of Saatchi Gallery, London, the Frank Suss Collection, New York City/London, and the Goetz Collection, Germany. Over the course of three years, between 2012 and 2015, Guijarro travelled to various quantum mechanics institutions around the world – from Cambridge and Oxford in the United Kingdom, to CERN in Switzerland, and MIT and UC Berkeley in the United States – photographing the blackboards as he found them, and reproducing them at 1:1 scale.

Momentum has been exhibited at Tristan Hoare, London, in 2012,at the Google Headquarters, New York and at The Contemporary Collectors Club, New York in 2013, and at Marlborough Gallery for PHotoEspaña15 in Madrid in 2015.

His second photographic series – LEAD – was shown in Spring 2017 at Tristan Hoare. For this, Guijarro visited the conservation departments at the Louvre, the Prado Museum and The National Gallery and photographed the X-rays and infrared scans of many prominent Old Master paintings, including the Mona Lisa by Leonardo da Vinci, The Battle of San Romano by Paolo Uccello, the Annunciation by Robert Campin, and Adam and Eve by Peter Paul Rubens.

Publications

Zine by Guijarro
Momentum Series. Southport, UK: Café Royal, 2016. With a text by Francis Hodgson. Edition of 200 copies.

Publications with contributions by Guijarro
Picking Up, Bouncing Back. By Alexander Garcia Düttman, Jean-Luc Nancy, and Olivier Richon. Edited by Rut Blees Luxemburg. London, Royal College of Art, 2010. .
New Order: British Art Today. By Phillipa Adams. London: Saatchi Gallery, 2014. . Exhibition Catalogue.
Blackboard - Art from Teaching / Learning from Art. Artipelag katalog 7. By Frida Andersson and Jessica Höglund. Värmdö, Sweden: Artipelag Konsthall, 2013. . Exhibition Catalogue.
Post-Photography: The Artist with the Camera. By Robert Shore. London: Elephant; Laurence King, 2014. .

Awards

2004. Premio de Fotografia Ministero de Economia, Spain (third place).
2007. ITS SIX(International Talent Support), Italy (finalist).
2009. The Villiers David Travel Award, London (winner).
2009. Royal College of Art Bursary, London (winner).
2009. Man Photography Prize, London (finalist).
2010. E-Creative Award, London (finalist).
2011. Festival international de Mode et de Photographie à Hyères, France (Shortlisted).
2013. PHotoEspaña13. Descubrimientos, Spain (finalist).
2015. Prix Pictet, London/Switzerland (Nomination).

References

External links

 Tristan Hoare Gallery: Alejandro Guijarro
 Saatchi Gallery: Alejandro Guijarro
 The Franks-Suss Collection: Alejandro Guijarro

1979 births
Living people
Spanish contemporary artists
Alumni of the Royal College of Art
21st-century Spanish artists
Date of birth missing (living people)